Kuchukovo (Kösök) is a rural locality (a village) in Ilchigulovsky Selsoviet, Uchalinsky District, Bashkortostan, Russia. The population was 72 as of 2010. There are 5 streets.

Geography 
Kuchukovo is located 82 km northeast of Uchaly (the district's administrative centre) by road. Suyundyukovo is the nearest rural locality.

References 

Rural localities in Uchalinsky District